Konishchevo is a rural locality (a village) in Krasnoplamenskoye Rural Settlement, Alexandrovsky District, Vladimir Oblast, Russia. The population was 1 as of 2010. There is 1 street.

Geography 
Konishchevo is located 43 km northwest of Alexandrov (the district's administrative centre) by road. Krasnoye Plamya is the nearest rural locality.

References 

Rural localities in Alexandrovsky District, Vladimir Oblast